KDFQ-LP channel 47 was the Azteca America affiliate for Prescott, Arizona. It was last owned by HC2 Holdings.

Originally established by Una Vez Más Holdings on channel 24, it was required to move when KTVK in Phoenix began using channel 24 for digital television. K24EP/KDFQ-LP was displaced for several years and commenced transmissions on channel 47 in December 2006.

The license was canceled at HC2's request on September 21, 2020, after having gone silent on November 12, 2018, due to repack displacement.

Digital channels

References

Innovate Corp.
DFQ-LP
Television channels and stations established in 1995
Television channels and stations disestablished in 2020
DFQ-LP
1995 establishments in Arizona
2020 disestablishments in Arizona
Defunct television stations in the United States
DFQ-LP